Raul Maldonado (born March 11, 1975) is a former Argentine football player.

Club statistics

References

External links

1975 births
Living people
Argentine footballers
J1 League players
Yokohama F. Marinos players
Association football forwards